Koltur is an island in the Faroe Islands, located to the west of Streymoy and to the north-west of Hestur. The name 'Koltur' means 'colt', in contrast with the name of the larger island to the south-east, 'Hestur', which means 'horse'. The island has just one settlement, Koltur. It was abandoned in the 1980s by the sheep-farmers whose flocks grazed on the southern part of the island. Since then only two people have returned (in 1994). Koltur has two mountains, Kolturshamar (478 m) and Fjallið (101m) which strictly speaking is not a mountain, the name however translates directly as "The Mountain" and is considered by many as the smallest mountain in the country.

The island supports 160 adult sheep.

History 
Archaeological excavations have found that barley has been cultivated on the island as far back as 800-900AD, in the early Viking age. And it has been cultivated up to near modern times, as straw from Koltur was considered the best for thatching, because there are no mice in the island to diminish the quality of the straw.

There have been two settlements on the islands, Heima í Húsi and Norðuri í Gerði. There is a story that the two families who lived there couldn't agree about anything and never helped each other with anything, this went on for generations and in the end, it was forgotten what the original argument was about. Though the place-name Trætumørkin, hints at the argument being about a parcel of land.

All peat for fuel had to be cut at Syðradal and Fossdal on Streymoy or later in Skopun, Sandoy, and then transported by boat back to Koltur where it was stored in houses at Gróthústanga.

Heima í Húsi is the older settlement, and it contains two farms, Niðri í Húsi and Uppi í Búð, and it is thought it is the original settlement on the island. The buildings are remarkably well preserved, and although they have had running repairs through the centuries there has been very little modernization compared to the rest of the country, and thus give a great insight into how people have lived in the past.

Norðuri í Gerði is a younger settlement, but the old buildings here are in much worse condition, though in the Jarðarbókini from 1584 it is confirmed that this settlement already had been built by then. This is the location of the only inhabited house today.

In 1890 there were 42 people living on the island, spread over 6 families.

1954 was the last time anyone was buried in the cemetery. The cemetery lies some 600 metres to the north-east of the settlement of Norðuri í Gerði; the isolation from the settlement is said to be due to its being haunted, as it could often go long stretches of time before a priest came to the island to throw earth on the grave, and put the dead properly to rest according to custom. 
 1987 - Føroya Forngripafelag calls on the authorities to come up with a plan for preserving the historically important locations.
 1990 - The plan for conservation and continued habitation is put forward
 1992 - 11 June, the authorities decide upon the future course of conservation, habitation and continued running of the farm.
 1994 - The farm Norðuri í Gerði is inhabited.
 1991 - 1996 Some buildings in the two settlements Norðuri í Gerði and Heima í Húsi are repaired.
 1996 - 2000 Fornminninevndin puts forward in 1996 a suggestion to expand the conservation of the settlements, the suggestion is approved in 2000
 2000 - 2012 Conservational work is done in various stages, with funding coming from various sources, most notably in 2008 the Mc-Kinney Møllers Fond donates 5 million Dkk to the restoration project. In 2012 the project is deemed complete, and is now open as a museum. 
 The aim now is to get Koltur classed as a national park, it is the only island which is run as an organic farm.

Transport 
There is a regular helicopter connection all around the year, operated by Atlantic Airways. In summertime there is also a boat connection from Gamlarætt and Tórshavn.

Important Bird Area
Most of the coastline of the island has been identified as an Important Bird Area by BirdLife International because of its significance as a breeding site for seabirds, especially European storm petrels (5000 pairs), Atlantic puffins (20,000 pairs) and black guillemots (50 pairs). It was once a breeding ground for the extinct great auk.

Gallery

References

External links 

 Personal website with 6 aerial photos of Koltur

Islands of the Faroe Islands
Populated places in the Faroe Islands
Important Bird Areas of the Faroe Islands